This is a list of women who were members of the European Parliament representing the United Kingdom. As well as those elected at European elections, it includes members appointed as delegates between 1973 and 1979. 
 List of female members of the European Parliament for the United Kingdom

Notes 

 *
European Parliament
Women
United Kingdom